Misgurnus is a genus of true loaches found in Europe and Asia. The origin of the name Misgurnus comes from the Greek word  (to hate) and the Turkish  (loud), a name given to them due to their habit of becoming very active during barometric pressure changes that occur during thunderstorms. The common names, weather loach or weatherfish, also derive from this behavior. Some species of misgurnus are eaten, mostly in Asia, and are also sold as pets in the aquarium trade. Their average size can range for 6 to over 12 inches.

Species
There are currently seven recognized species in this genus:
 Misgurnus anguillicaudatus (Cantor, 1842) (pond loach,oriental weatherfish)
 Misgurnus buphoensis R. T. Kim & S. Y. Park, 1995
 Misgurnus fossilis (Linnaeus, 1758) (weatherfish)
 Misgurnus mohoity (Dybowski, 1869)
 Misgurnus multimaculatus Rendahl (de), 1944
 Misgurnus nikolskyi Vasil'eva, 2001
 Misgurnus tonkinensis Rendahl (de), 1937

See also
 Paramisgurnus dabryanus, a closely related species
 Cobitis taenia, sometimes called "spotted weather loach"

References

 
Cobitidae